Spilt Milk is Australia's biggest single day music festival that is held in Canberra, Australia, Ballarat, Australia and Gold Coast, Australia. 
Spilt Milk was established by Kicks Entertainment and has sold out within hours every single year of launching. Their first festival was held on Saturday 3 December 2016 in Canberra, ACT.

Awards and nominations

National Live Music Awards
The National Live Music Awards (NLMAs) are a broad recognition of Australia's diverse live industry, celebrating the success of the Australian live scene. The awards commenced in 2016.

|-
|  National Live Music Awards of 2018
| Spilt Milk 
| ACT Live Event of the Year
| 
|-
|  National Live Music Awards of 2018
| Spilt Milk 
| ACT Live Event of the Year
| 
|-

Lineups year by year
As listed on the official website. Bold indicates headline act. All acts are Australian unless stated otherwise.

2016
In Alphabetical Order
 Allday
 Champion Ruby
 Coda Conduct
 Cosmo's Midnight
 Client Liaison
 Dena Amy
 DMA's
 E^ST
 Emma Stevenson
 FB Perimeter
 Flume
 Gang Of Youths
 Genesis Owusu
 Hermitude
 Honey Dijon (USA) 
 Honeysuckle (USA)
 Hot Dub Time Machine
 Kangaroo Life Saver
 LDRU
 Lucy CLiche
 Magda Bytnerowicz
 Megan Bones
 Olympia
 Paces
 Peking Duk
 Randomer (UK)
 Skin & Bones
 Sondrio
 Slumberjack
 Sticky Fingers 
 Turquoise Prince LTC
 Valerie Yum
 Ventures
 Vince Staples (USA)
 Violent Soho 
 Young Monks

2017
In Alphabetical Order
 Alison Wonderland
 Avon Stringer
 Bad Dreems
 Blanke
 Carmada
 Cashmere Cat (NOR)
 Casual Connection
 Crooked Colours 
 Dean Lewis
 Dune Rats
 Feki
 Illy
 Jax Jones (UK)
 KG
 Kilter
 King Gizzard & the Lizard Wizard
 Lorde (NZ)
 Mallrat
 Manila Folder
 Mia Sorlie
 Megan Bones
 Pon Cho
 Remi x Sampa the Great 
 San Cisco
 Sports
 Super Cruel
 Tash Sultana
 Vallis Alps 
 Vance Joy
 What So Not
 Winston Surfshirt

2018
In Alphabetical Order
 Angus & Julia Stone
 Blanke
 Carmouflage Rose
 Channel Tres (USA)
 Childish Gambino (USA)
 Cub Sport
 Ebony Boadu
 Golden Features
 Hatchie
 Hayden James 
 Jack River
 Kinder
 Kira Puru
 Kwame 
 Manu Crooks
 Methyl Ethel
 Miss Blanks
 Moaning Lisa
 Peking Duk
 RL Grime (USA)
 Rolling Blackouts Coastal Fever  
 ShockOne
 Skegss
 Thandi Phoenix
 The Jungle Giants
 The Wombats (UK)
 Thundamentals
 Vera Blue
 Willaris. K
 YG (USA)

Note: Childish Gambino cancelled his appearance at Spilt Milk due to a foot injury. He was replaced by Angus & Julia Stone and Golden Features.

2019
 Allday
 Arno Faraji
 Benee (NZ)
 Choomba
 Chvrches (UK)
 Confidence Man
 Dom Dolla
 Dune Rats
 G Flip
 Godlands
 Golden Features
 Groove City
 Illy
 Juice Wrld (USA)
 Khalid (USA)
 Kota Banks
 Lastlings
 Lime Cordiale
 Mansionair
 Middle Kids
 Ocean Alley
 Psychedelic Porn Crumpets
 Running Touch
 Sippy
 Tones and I
 Winston Surfshirt
 Rat!Hammock (Ballarat only)
 Teen Jesus and the Jean Teasers(Canberra only)
 The Ballarat festival would be Juice Wrld's final performance before his death on 8 December 2019.

2022
In Alphabetical Order
 A.GIRL
 Beddy Rays
 Billy Xane
 Brittany De Marco & Haylee Karmer 
 Fisher
 Flume
 Friends of Friends
 G Flip
 Gangz
 Genesis Owusu
 Hayden James
 Jack Burton and Clique 
  Jynx House DJs 
 King Stingray
 Kobie Dee
 Lashes 
 Latifa Tee
 Little Fritter
 Mallrat
 Mansionair
 Mason Flint 
 Miroji 
 Ninajirachi
 Peach Prc
 Saint Lane 
 Sesame Girl 
 Shaka J 
 Siala 
 Spacey Jane
 Stand Atlantic
 Stormzy (UK)
 Sweat Dreams DJs 
 Telenova
 Tekido
 Toro Y Moi (US)
  Waxlily 
 Wiigz
 The Wombats (UK)
 Yng Martyr
 Young Franco
 1300

References

Concert tours
Rock festivals in Australia
Music festivals established in 2016
Electronic music festivals in Australia
2016 establishments in Australia